The Foundation For Polish Science  is an independent, non-profit making organisation which aim at improving the opportunities for doing research in Poland. Established in 1990, registered in 1991, the Foundation's mission is to provide assistance and support to the scientific community in Poland.  The strategy of Foundation For Polish Science is to support research groups and individual scientists, realised through individual prizes, grants and scholarships awarded by FNP, including the Prize of the Foundation for Polish Science. Its effort is widely regarded as crucial in transforming Polish science after 1989.

Programs
Foundation offers scholarships and grants for outstanding researchers at every career stage, regardless the citizenship of candidates.

 Prize of the Foundation, also known as The Polish Nobel Prize- the most important scientific prize in Poland, which is awarded in four fields: Earth sciences, Chemistry and material science, Mathematics, physics and engineering, as well as humanities and social sciences. Each recipient gets 200,000 zł (about $65,000).
 The Polish-American Scientific Award - a common undertaking between the Foundation for Polish Science and the American Association for the Advancement of Science
 The Polish-German scientific award Copernicus - offered jointly by FNP and Deutsche Forschungsgemeinschaft
 Mistrz
 Homing Plus - a program designed to encourage Polish scientists who have emigrated to return home. 
 Stypendia START

Architecture

The new FNP Headquarters are located in Wierzbno, in a World War II surviving building. The building has recently been renovated and the facade is now covered in greenery. The Living Wall is the first in Poland and apart from the environmental benefits it helps blend the building with the green surroundings.

See also 
 Polish science and technology
 Polish Children's Fund
 The National Science Centre

References

External links
Foundation For Polish Science 
Foundation for Polish Science Headquarters design by FAAB Architektura 

Scientific organisations based in Poland
Organizations established in 1991
1991 establishments in Poland